Imo's Pizza is an American chain of pizza restaurants headquartered in St. Louis, Missouri. As of 2020, the company says it has more than 100 restaurants and stores in Missouri, Illinois and Kansas.

The chain was founded by Ed and Margie Imo in St. Louis in 1964.

As of November 2015, Imo's was ranked the 32nd-largest pizza chain in the United States with gross sales of $93.8 million. 

The chain is known for its version of St. Louis-style pizza, which is common in the area and features provel cheese—a combination of cheddar, Swiss, and provolone with a low melting point and gooey texture. The restaurants also sell salads, submarine sandwiches, and desserts, the last including ones that can be made in a pizza oven.

See also 

 List of pizza chains of the United States
 St. Louis cuisine

References

External links 
 Imo's Pizza website.

Cuisine of St. Louis
Restaurants in St. Louis
Companies based in St. Louis 
Economy of the Midwestern United States
Pizza franchises
Regional restaurant chains in the United States
Pizza chains of the United States
Restaurants established in 1964
1964 establishments in Missouri